Jurica Buljat (born 19 September 1986) is a Croatian professional footballer who plays as a defender for HNK Zadar.

Club career
On 20 June 2011, Buljat signed a three-year contract with Israeli defending champion Maccabi Haifa.

Buljat made his debut on 2011–12 UEFA Champions League second qualifying round, 13 July 2011, against Borac Banja Luka.

He was released from the Israeli club after one year.

Buljat signed for Ukrainian side FC Metalist Kharkiv in February, 2015. At Metalist, Buljat made 11 appearances. He was released at the end of the season.

On 13 January 2017, Buljat signed for Uzbekistani club Pakhtakor Tashkent for the 2017 season after having featured 25 times for Bunyodkor of the same country. On 20 July 2017, he moved to FC BATE Borisov of Belarus.

On 14 March 2018, Buljat signed a short-term contract with Bulgarian First League side Lokomotiv Plovdiv.  He left the club at the end of the 2017–18 season.

International career
He made his debut for Croatia in a May 2010 friendly match away against Estonia, coming on as a late substitute for Milan Badelj, and earned a total of 2 caps, scoring no goals. His second and final international was an October 2010 friendly against Norway.

Career statistics

Club

International

Statistics accurate as of match played 12 October 2010

References

External links

1986 births
Living people
Sportspeople from Zadar
Association football central defenders
Croatian footballers
Croatia youth international footballers
Croatia under-21 international footballers
Croatia international footballers
UEFA Euro 2012 players
NK Zadar players
HNK Hajduk Split players
Maccabi Haifa F.C. players
FC Energie Cottbus players
FC Metalist Kharkiv players
FC Bunyodkor players
Pakhtakor Tashkent FK players
FC BATE Borisov players
PFC Lokomotiv Plovdiv players
NK Inter Zaprešić players
Hetten FC players
Croatian Football League players
Israeli Premier League players
2. Bundesliga players
Ukrainian Premier League players
Uzbekistan Super League players
Belarusian Premier League players
First Professional Football League (Bulgaria) players
Saudi First Division League players
Croatian expatriate footballers
Expatriate footballers in Israel
Expatriate footballers in Germany
Expatriate footballers in Ukraine
Expatriate footballers in Uzbekistan
Expatriate footballers in Belarus
Expatriate footballers in Bulgaria
Expatriate footballers in Saudi Arabia
Croatian expatriate sportspeople in Israel
Croatian expatriate sportspeople in Germany
Croatian expatriate sportspeople in Ukraine
Croatian expatriate sportspeople in Uzbekistan
Croatian expatriate sportspeople in Belarus
Croatian expatriate sportspeople in Bulgaria
Croatian expatriate sportspeople in Saudi Arabia